Alrick Riley (born 1964) is a BAFTA award-winning English television director and writer, and former child actor.

He is well known for his work on the British series Spooks (known as MI-5 in some countries) and Hustle; along with his more recent work on the American fairytale drama Once Upon a Time.

Life and career
Riley was born in London, England. A shy lad, his Jamaican parents "made" him go to an acting club as a young child to force him "out of himself". He began his career as a child actor at the age of eleven on the British series Some Mothers Do 'Ave 'Em, as a featured extra. He went on to work as an actor on several series, such as: Johnny Jarvis and Me and My Girl, as well as in the 1979 film Scum. After leaving high school, he knew he no longer wanted to act, but "definitely wanted to stay in the business." He and a friend bought an 8mm camera, and he discovered his passion for direction. Riley's mother was initially against his pursuit of directing, in favour of theatre arts. She was concerned that he wouldn't be able to be successful as a pioneering black television director. He attended West Midlands University, before attending the prestigious National Film & Television School. Two short films he directed while at the school, Money Talk and Concrete Garden, went on to be screened at multiple international film festivals. Riley credits Martin Scorsese and Francis Ford Coppola as notable inspirations, but accredits his love of film to Charles Burnett. In 2007, Riley co-founded, with Louise Decoteau, the production company Cinnamon Films.

Riley has gone on to have an illustrious career in television direction in both the United Kingdom and United States. He's helmed episodes of Playing the Field, Stanton Blues, The Inspector Lynley Mysteries, Hotel Babylon, Silent Witness, Boy Meets Girl, Ashes to Ashes, Bedlam, Spooks, Hustle, Hunted, Death in Paradise, Perception, Castle, NCIS, Legends, NCIS: New Orleans, The Walking Dead, Person of Interest, Tyrant and Once Upon a Time.

He won a BAFTA award for his work on the UK series The Cops, he shared the award with Eric Coulter and Harry Bradbeer. His winning of the prestigious honour marked the first time in the history of the assembly that a black man was recognised. He has since participated on the juries of the organisation, educating others in film and television making.

Select filmography

Direction

References

External links

1964 births
English film directors
English television directors
Black British male actors
English people of Jamaican descent
Living people
Male actors from London
English male child actors